KGBT-TV (channel 4) is a television station licensed to Harlingen, Texas, United States, serving the Lower Rio Grande Valley as a primary Antenna TV owned-and-operated station and a secondary MyNetworkTV affiliate. It is owned by Nexstar Media Group alongside Brownsville-licensed dual NBC/CBS affiliate KVEO-TV (channel 23). Both stations share studios on West Expressway (I-2/US 83) in Harlingen, while KGBT-TV's transmitter is located in La Feria, Texas.

KGBT-TV was the first television station established on the American side of the Rio Grande Valley and is the oldest still in operation. Long the CBS affiliate for the area, this changed when Nexstar acquired KGBT's non-license assets from Sinclair Broadcast Group and moved the CBS programming to a subchannel of KVEO in 2020. Nexstar later acquired the KGBT-TV license itself.

History

Early history 
KGBT-TV's roots lie in the 1941 establishment of KGBS radio, an independent radio station with a staff of eleven people. The station was owned by the Harbenito Broadcasting Company, controlled former Valley Morning Star publisher McHenry Tichenor, and became an affiliate of the CBS Radio Network in 1943.

The first television station in the market was XELD-TV (channel 7); founded in 1951, it served as an end-run around the Federal Communications Commission's freeze on television license grants. Once this was lifted in 1952, the radio stations on the U.S. side of the Rio Grande got their opportunity to pursue television stations of their own. On May 20, 1953, Magic Triangle Televisors, Inc., an affiliate of KGBS, was granted a construction permit for channel 4. Roy Hofheinz, who at the time owned radio station KSOX (1530 AM) in the area, withdrew his application; later in the year, KGBS bought the KSOX facility and moved from 1240 to 1530 kHz.

On October 4, 1953, KGBS-TV made its debut with CBS television programming. The call letters were changed to KGBT-TV on December 9, though the new designation was not used until the start of 1954, when the radio station also became KGBT. The next year, KRGV-TV channel 5 started with NBC programs, and XELD-TV closed. For the next 22 years, the two stations split ABC programming; when KRGV-TV changed to being a primary ABC affiliate in 1976, KGBT-TV became a joint CBS-NBC affiliate until KVEO-TV began in 1981.

Channel 4 remained under Tichenor ownership for more than 30 years and was the traditional ratings leader in the Rio Grande Valley for news. However, as Tichenor's broadcasting empire became specialized in Spanish-language radio, KGBT-TV became an outlier. In 1986, Tichenor sold KGBT-TV to Draper Communications of Salisbury, Maryland, which at the time owned WBOC-TV in that city and KOAM-TV in Pittsburg, Kansas. The station was then purchased in 1998 by Cosmos Broadcasting, the broadcasting division of the Liberty Corporation, for $42 million. Cosmos came directly under the Liberty banner in 2001 when Liberty sold off its insurance business.

Barrington and Sinclair ownership 
On August 25, 2005, Liberty Corporation announced that it would sell all 15 stations it owned to Raycom Media. Raycom, however, then earmarked several stations for divestiture in order to meet local and national ownership limits or because they were located far from the company's focus areas; these included two of the Liberty stations, KGBT-TV and WWAY-TV in Wilmington, North Carolina. The Liberty deal was then completed on January 31, 2006.

Shortly afterwards, on March 27, 2006, KGBT-TV was sold again to Barrington Broadcasting as part of a group deal to acquire 11 other Raycom stations, effectively becoming the only former station from the Liberty catalog to be bought out by Barrington. The FCC approved the deal in June 2006, and the purchase closed August 11. Barrington then sold its portfolio of 18 stations in all to Sinclair Broadcast Group in 2013.

Sale to Nexstar Media Group 

In 2017, Sinclair attempted to acquire Tribune Media. The acquisition collapsed in August 2018, after which Tribune was instead acquired by Nexstar. Tribune had previously filed a breach of contract lawsuit against Sinclair, which Sinclair and Nexstar—as successor-in-interest to Tribune—settled on January 28, 2020.

As part of the settlement, Sinclair paid Nexstar $60 million and sold WDKY-TV in Lexington, Kentucky and the non-license and programming assets of KGBT-TV to Nexstar. KGBT-TV's CBS affiliation, news department, and syndicated programming moved to KVEO's second subchannel the next day. On-air operations mostly remained unchanged, though viewers were asked to rescan their sets in order to continue watching CBS. However, few viewers actually lost access to CBS programming due to the high penetration of cable and satellite in the market.

The KGBT-TV license itself continued to be owned by Sinclair and continued to broadcast its existing digital multicast offerings, with the main 4.1 subchannel silent on the multiplex. The acquisition of the KGBT-TV intellectual unit also allowed Nexstar to move all of KVEO-TV's operations to the KGBT-TV facility in Harlingen and replace the local newscasts it had offered on that station, presented from El Paso, with a news service fully produced locally.

In May 2021, Mission Broadcasting, a company whose stations contract with Nexstar for operational services, acquired KGBT-TV; Nexstar then announced on July 19 of that year that it would purchase the station outright. The deal was completed on September 15. That same day, the main 4.1 subchannel was reactivated, carrying Nexstar-owned Antenna TV, which had never been carried in the market prior; MyNetworkTV, which had previously been on KFXV, was added to the subchannel on October 1.

News operation

24/7 Weather Lab 
KGBT-TV was the first news station in the metropolitan area with its own live weather radar, which was called "Live Super Doppler." KGBT-TV broadcast a 24-hour weather station, which provided updated local forecasts.

On April 29, 2008, KGBT-TV's 43-year veteran weatherman, Larry James, retired. James was a veteran of the station's "glory days" during the late 1960s and 1970s when the station produced the top-rated newscast in the Rio Grande Valley.

"Sports Extra" 
KGBT-TV formerly aired "Sports Extra", an extended sports segment that aired during the 10 p.m. newscasts on Fridays and Sundays. The main focus of the Friday segment was local high school football games, while the Sunday edition provided the highlights of high school, college and professional football, and generally featured a panel of local sports writers and sports talk radio personalities, who break down high school football games and provide analysis.

Prior to the start of the high school football season, KGBT produced Action 4 Sports: Countdown to Kickoff. The hour-long special briefly previewed each team in the Rio Grande Valley. As of September 2008, "Sunday Sports Extra" is in association with 956 Sports. 956sports.com provides commentators who share their input and provide analysis.

Notable former on-air staff 
Angela Hill (later at WWL-TV for 4 decades, retired)

Technical information

Subchannels
The station's digital signal is multiplexed.

KGBT's broadcasts became digital-only, effective June 12, 2009.

References

1953 establishments in Texas
Antenna TV affiliates
MyNetworkTV affiliates
Comet (TV network) affiliates
Ion Mystery affiliates
Estrella TV affiliates
Grit (TV network) affiliates
Harlingen, Texas
Nexstar Media Group
Rewind TV affiliates
Television channels and stations established in 1953
Television stations in the Lower Rio Grande Valley